The discography of Karel Gott, a Czech singer.

Albums

Studio

Live

Singles 

A"Für Immer Jung" also peaked at #70 in Switzerland.

DVD 
 2004: Mein Prag

Other appearances
1987: "Neznámy pár" - duet with Marika Gombitová, Ateliér duše
1987: "Hrajme píseň" - trio with Marika Gombitová and Josef Laufer
2011: ''Tante Cose da Veder with Hapka, Horáček & Ondřej Brzobohatý

References

External links

http://www.discographien.de/alle_cds_von_Karel+Gott.htm

Discographies of Czech artists
Pop music discographies